The Puget Power Building was a four story tall building in Bellevue, Washington. When it was built in 1956 as the corporate headquarters for Puget Sound Power and Light (popularly known as Puget Power), it was the tallest building in Bellevue and on the Eastside. It was described by conservationists as "the best example of the International Style on the Eastside".

The property was sold to a developer by Puget Sound Energy, the successor to Puget Power. The same day the sale was recorded, the building appeared on the annual list of most endangered historic properties compiled by Washington Trust for Historic Preservation.

The building was demolished in 2006 to make way for a new high-rise development that was to become Bellevue Towers, one of which shared the title of highest building in Bellevue.

References

Further reading

External links
Image (elevated), from UW Digital Collections, circa 1969
Image (ground level), from UW Digital Collections, circa 1969

 

 
 

Buildings and structures in Bellevue, Washington
Puget Sound Energy
Buildings and structures demolished in 2006
Demolished buildings and structures in Washington (state)